Robbie Wu Chun Ming (born 21 November 1997 in Hong Kong) is a Hong Kong professional footballer who currently plays for Hong Kong Premier League club Eastern.

Youth career
During his high school years at YMCA of Hong Kong Christian College, Wu joined the Wanchai academy after taking an interest in football due to his father, who was a football fan. He later joined the Pegasus academy where he helped his side to win the 2014-15 Hong Kong FA Youth Cup.

On 12 March 2016, Wu scored the only goal in a 1-0 victory for the City University of Hong Kong in The University Sports Federation of Hong Kong's football championship game.

Club career
On 7 July 2015, Wu signed his first professional contract with Pegasus.

On 3 February 2016, Wu made his first team debut in a 2015–16 Hong Kong FA Cup match against his former youth club Wan Chai. He made his league debut later that year on 7 May, coming on as a substitute against Rangers.

On 12 June 2019, Wu announced that he would be leaving Pegasus after six years in order to challenge himself at a new club.

On 30 June 2019, it was reported that Wu had signed with Eastern.

On 1 September 2020, it was announced that Wu would return to Pegasus on loan for the following season.

International career
Despite having yet reached the age of 16, Wu was selected for the Hong Kong U-18 squad that competed in the 2014 AFC U-19 Championship qualification tournament. He made two appearances for the team during the tournament.

Wu was selected again for the 2016 AFC U-19 Championship qualification tournament where he appeared in all four games.

In July 2017, Wu was selected for the Hong Kong U-22 squad ahead of the 2018 AFC U-23 Championship qualification tournament where he appeared in all three games. He scored the opener against North Korea in a 1-1 draw.

On 5 October 2017, Wu made his senior national team debut in a 4-0 win over Laos.

Career statistics

International

Honours

Club
Pegasus
Hong Kong FA Cup: 2015–16

Individual
Best Young Player: 2019

References

External links

Living people
Hong Kong footballers
Hong Kong international footballers
Hong Kong Premier League players
TSW Pegasus FC players
Eastern Sports Club footballers
1997 births
Association football midfielders
Association football central defenders
Footballers at the 2018 Asian Games
Asian Games competitors for Hong Kong
Hong Kong League XI representative players